Bootland is a surname. Notable people with the surname include:

Bob Bootland (died 2007), English football manager
Charles Bootland (born 1916), Scottish footballer
Darryl Bootland (born 1981), Canadian ice hockey player
Nick Bootland (born 1978), Canadian ice hockey player and coach